Foshee is an unincorporated community in Escambia County, Alabama, United States between Brewton and Pollard on U.S. Route 29. Foshee was founded as a sawmill town and named after Stewart J. Foshee, who owned several sawmills in Escambia County. Russell A. Alger and Martin Sullivan founded the Alger-Sullivan Lumber Company in the late 1890s and began logging around Foshee. They used lumber from the mill to build a new sawmill in Florida, which eventually grew into the town of Century. A post office was operated in Foshee from 1914 to 1924.

Notable person
 Ed Morris, a Major League Baseball pitcher from 1922 to 1931.

References

Unincorporated communities in Alabama
Unincorporated communities in Escambia County, Alabama